Kevin Michael Manning (born 2 November 1933) is an Australian retired Roman Catholic bishop. He served as Bishop of Parramatta from 1997 to 2010, and now holds the title Bishop Emeritus. He had previously been a parish priest in the Diocese of Bathurst, and he served as Bishop of Armidale from 1991 to 1997.

References

1933 births
Living people
Roman Catholic bishops of Armidale
Roman Catholic bishops of Parramatta